Camp Beale Springs, near Kingman, Arizona, also known as Fort Beale, was a historic military facility that dates from 1857. Camp Beale Springs was established and became official in 1871. It was listed on the National Register of Historic Places in 1974.  Its location is not disclosed by the National Register, as is done for many archeological sites which have importance for their potential to yield information in the future.

It was a campsite on the Beale Wagon Road developed by Captain Edward Beale.  For centuries previous it had been used already.

References 

Buildings and structures completed in 1857
Buildings and structures in Kingman, Arizona
Archaeological sites in Arizona
National Register of Historic Places in Kingman, Arizona
1857 establishments in New Mexico Territory